The Matterhorn or Flying Bobs, sometimes known by alternate names such as Musik Express or Terminator, is an amusement ride very similar to the Superbob, which consists of a number of cars attached to axles that swing in and out. The hill and valley shape of the ride causes a pronounced swinging motion: the faster the ride goes, the more dramatic the swinging motion. This ride is commonly seen at a travelling funfairs. Most carnivals and parks require riders to be at least 42 inches or taller.

United States
Rides are commonly known as "Flying Bobs". They can typically be found at carnivals, where another common name for them is the "Himalaya," but can also exist at amusement parks such as the Flying Bobs at DelGrosso's Amusement Park, KonTiki at Six Flags New England and at Coney Island (Cincinnati) and Matterhorn at Cedar Point and Lake Winnepesaukah. The carnival rides are typically transported on two trucks. One is for the ride itself, and the other is for the swinging cars.

All rides are essentially similar in concept, but have varying designs. Cars typically move forward and backward at varying intervals during the ride.

The Allan Herschell Company made the first "Flying Bobs" in the 1960s. Chance-Morgan currently manufactures a few versions, called the "Alpine Bobs" or "Thunder Bolt." Mack manufactures the Matterhorn, Feria Swing, and Petersburg Schilitenfahrt (Sleigh Ride). Another common manufacturer of the Matterhorn is Bertazzon.

It is currently unknown for what company that manufactured the other version, called "Rip Curl" in Fun Spot in Orlando, Florida.

United Kingdom
The common analog of the Matterhorn is the Music Express. The main difference between the two rides is the Music Express' use of a track, rather than axles. These versions can also be found in the United States, but have been discontinued by all manufacturers except Bertazzon.

Rides manufacturers
Bertazzon
Chance Morgan
Mack Rides
Reverchon Industries

See also
Matterhorn

External links
Matterhorn History at the nfa.
Database of Matterhorns travelling in the UK.
Video featuring a Matterhorn.

References

Amusement rides